Excoecaria cochinchinensis (Chinese croton, blindness tree, buta buta, jungle fire plant) is a species of plant in the genus Excoecaria, which is a member of the family Euphorbiaceae. It is native to Southeast Asia and China. It is a subtropical evergreen shrub with a woody stem, growing up to 1–2 meters (3.3–6.6 ft) high. Its leaves are opposite, their texture shiny and papery, the upper surface dark green or variegated and the underside a deep maroon. The leaves measure  6–14 cm by 2–4 cm (2.4–5.5 in by 0.8–1.6 in). It is dioecious.

Name
The common name of blindness tree comes from Latin, "excoecaria", to make blind. Sap in the eyes is reported to causes blindness. The Latin name cochinchinensis derives from Cochinchina, an old name for Vietnam.

Uses
Excoecaria cochinchinensis is cultivated as an ornamental tropical plant, greenhouse plant, or houseplant. A popular colorful cultivar is "Firestorm."

Precautions
As with many of the Euphorbiaceae, the sap is toxic and can cause skin eczema in some people. It is also toxic if eaten, though in small quantities, it has been used in herbal medicine to treat gastric ulcers.

Though the plant is considered poisonous, it has beneficial uses as an antiparasitic, antipruritic, and haemostatic treatment.

References

cochinchinensis
House plants
Dioecious plants